Lewalevu (also Lewa-Levu, or "The Great Woman") is a fertility goddess in Fijian mythology.

References

Fijian deities
Fertility goddesses